Armenian revolutionary songs (Hay heghapokhagan yerker) are songs that promote Armenian patriotism. The origins of these songs lay largely in the late nineteenth and early twentieth centuries, when Armenian political parties were established to struggle for the political and civil rights of Armenians living in the Ottoman Empire.

History 
The Armenian revolutionary movement, initially led by the Social Democrat Hunchakian Party (est. 1887) and the Armenian Revolutionary Federation (est. 1890), took place in the late nineteenth and early twentieth centuries. This was caused by years of oppression from the Ottoman Empire, especially under the rule of sultan Abdul Hamid II. This was the period when Armenians began demanding their most basic rights and defending Armenian towns from Ottoman oppression. Certain armed Armenian patriotic groups formed to fight the Turkish oppression and defend Armenian towns from Kurdish brigands. These volunteer fighters were called fedayees. In some instances, they were successful in defending Armenian locals, earning them popular support and elevating them to the status of heroes. This environment was thus ideal for the development of Armenian patriotic songs to support these freedom fighters.

Meaning 
Some of the songs tell the stories of individual fedayees, such as Serob Pasha and General Andranik, who confronted the Turkish onslaught. They also talk about historical battles, successful guerrilla operations, heroic deaths, and genocide, among other sensitive topics.

The songs are generally heard at Armenian gatherings. It is also seen as a way to educate the newer generation of Armenians about their history through the songs.

Armenian revolutionary songs are very popular among the youth of the Armenian diaspora.

List 
Below is a list of several well-known Armenian songs. Popular current singers of these include Karnig Sarkissian, George Tutunjian, Nersik Ispiryan, Harout Pamboukjian, Berj Nakkashian, Samuel Vartanian.

Note that the English transcription of their Armenian names has been carried out in the Eastern Armenian dialect.

{| class="wikitable sortable"
! Original name
! Transcription 
! English translation
! Lyrics
! Music 
! Date
! Performed by
! Note
|-
! Հայ քաջեր
| Hay kajer 
| Armenian braves
| Nersik Ispiryan
| Nersik Ispiryan
|
| Harout Pamboukjian, Nersik Ispiryan
|
|-
! Հասնինք Սասուն
| Hasnink Sasun
| We'll Get to Sasun
| 
| 
|
| Harout Pamboukjian
|
|-
! Պիտի գնանք
| Piti gnank
| We Must Go
| 
| 
|
| Nersik Ispiryan
|
|-
! Դաշնակ Դրո
| Dashnak Dro 
| ARF member Dro
|
|
|
| Hrant & Gayane
| Dedicated to Drastamat Kanayan (Dro)
|-
! Ձայն տուր ով ֆիդա
| Dzayn tur ov fida 
| Speak up, fedayee
|
|
|
| Sahak Sahakyan
| 
|-
! Քաջ Նժդեհ
| Kaj Nzhdeh
| Brave Nzhdeh
|
|
|
| Nersik Ispiryan
| Dedicated to Garegin Nzhdeh
|-
! Գևորգ Չավուշի հիշատակին
| Gevorg Chavushi hishatakin
| In Memory of Chavush
|
|
|
| Nersik Ispiryan
| Dedicated to the memory of Kevork Chavush
|-
! Հայ ֆիդայիք
| Hay fedayik
| Armenian fedayees
|
|
|
| Harout Pamboukjian
| Dedicated to the Battle of Holy Apostles Monastery, 1901
|-
! Գինի լից 
| Gini lits
| Pour Wine
|
|
|
|
| Dedicated to the assassination of Talaat Pasha, one of the top men 
responsible for the Armenian genocide, by Soghomon Tehlirian
|-
! Ախպերս ու ես
| Akhpers u yes
| My brother and I
|
|
| 
|
|
|-
! Կովկասի քաջեր 
| Kovkasi kajer 
| Caucasian Braves
|
|
|
|
|
|-
! Արդյոք ովքեր ե՞ն
| Artyok ovker en
| Who Are They?
|
|
|
|
|
|-
! Արյունոտ դրոշ 
| Aryunot drosh
| Bloody Flag
|
|
|
|
|
|-
! Գետաշեն
| Getashen 
| Getashen
|
|
|
|
|
|- 
! Լեռան լանջին
| Leran lanjin
| On the Slope of a Mountain
|
|
|
|
|
|- 
! Մեր Հայրենիք
| Mer Hayrenik
| Our Fatherland
|
|
|
|
| The national anthem of Armenia
|-  
! Զարթի՛ր, լաօ
| Zartir lao
| Wake up, my dear
|
|
|
|
|
|- 
! Զեյթունցիներ
| Zeytuntsiner 
| People of Zeytun 
|
|
|
|
|
|- 
! Ադանայի կոտորածը
| Adanayi godoradzuh
| The Adana Massacre
|
|
|
|
|
|-
! Աքսորի երգը 
| Aksori Yerkuh
| The Song of a Refugee
|
|
|
|
|
|-
! Պանք Օթօմանի գրաւումը
| Bank Otomani gravume
| Bank Ottoman Takeover 
|
|
|
|
| Dedicated to the 1896 Ottoman Bank Takeover
|-
! Լիսբոն 5 տղոց երգը
| Lisbon 5 Dghots Yerkuh
|
|
|
|
|
|
|-
! Մենք անկեղծ զինուոր ենք
| Menk Angeghdz Zinvor Enk
| We Are Sincere Soldiers
|
|
|
|
|
|-
! Սերոբ Փաշայի երգը
| Serop Pashayi Yerkuh
| The Song of Serop Pasha
|
|
|
|
|Dedicated to Aghbiur Serob
|-
! Ձայն մը հնչեց Էրզըրումի հայոց լեռներէն
| Tsayn Muh Hnchets Erzerumi Hayots Lerneren| A call sounded from the Armenian mountains of Erzerum
|
|
|
|
|
|-
! Ով որ քաջ է
| Ov vor qaj e
| Who is brave
| 
| 
|
| Sahak Sahakyan, Karnig Sarkissian
| Dedicated to Aghbiur Serob
|-
! Հիմի է՛լ լռենք
| Hima el lrenq
| Be silent now!
| Raphael Patkanian
|
|
| Sahak Sahakyan
|
|-
!Ազատության Սիրույն Համար
|Azatutyan siruyn hamar
|For beautiful freedom
|
|
|
|Hovhannes Badalyan, Armen Guirag
|
|-
!Տալվորիկ
|Dalvorik
|Dalvorik
|Mihran Damadian
|
|
|Armen Guirag, Hovhannes Badalyan, Nersik Ispiryan, Hayrik Muradyan
|Dedicated to the 1904 Sasun uprising and the last stand at Talvorik Valley
|-
!Եփրեմ Խանի Երգը
|Yeprem Khani Yeruh
|The Song of Yeprem Khan
|
|
|
|
|Dedicated to Yeprem Khan
|-
!Իբրև Արծիվ
|Ibrev Artsiv
|As an Eagle
|
|
|
|Karnig Sarkissian, Hovhannes Badalyan, Ara Guiragossian 
|Dedicated to Andranik
|-
!Դաշնակցական Խումբ
|Dashnaktsakan Khumb
|Dashnak Group
|
|
|
|Karnig Sarkissian
|
|-
!Արազի Ափին
|Arazi Apin
|On the Banks of the Aras
|
|
|
|Ara Guiragossian, Karnig Sarkissian
|Dedicated to Garegin Nzhdeh
|-
!Դարձյալ Փայլեց
|Dardzyal Paylets
|
|
|
|
|
|Dedicated to Hrayr Dzhoghk
|-
!Ախ Վասպուրական
|Akh Vaspurakan
|Oh Vaspurakan
|
|
|
|Armen Guirag
|
|-
!Բամբ Որոտան
|Bamb Vorotan
|
|Ghevont Alishan
|
|
|Hovhannes Badalyan, Ara Guiragossian
|
|}

https://web.archive.org/web/20160305234018/http://armcamping.com/2011/04/ergum-enq-arshavneri-yntatsqum

Lyrics

See also
Armenian genocide
Armenian national awakening in the Ottoman Empire
Timeline of Armenian national movement
Hamidian Massacres

Notes

Further reading
Nalbandian, Louise. The Armenian Revolutionary Movement: The Development of Armenian Political Parties Through the Nineteenth Century''. Berkeley: University of California Press, 1963.

External links 
 Armenian Revolutionary (Tashnag) and Patriotic Song Lyrics on FEDAYI.COM

Lists of patriotic songs
Rev